Abdul Mannan Khan (born 30 June 1952) is a Bangladesh Awami League politician and a former state minister of housing and public works and a former Jatiya Sangsad member representing the Dhaka-1 constituency.

Career

Corruption charges
On 21  August 2014, Khan was sued by Anti-Corruption Commission (ACC) on charges of amassing illegal wealth. Khan's asset increased to over Tk 5.25 crore from Tk 5.39 lakh in 6 years, according to his wealth statements submitted to the Election Commission. 3 days later, a Dhaka court granted him bail till 13 October in the case.

ACC charged Khan and his wife, Syeda Hasina Sultana, in another corruption case on 8 May 2015.

No charges were framed against the two corruption cases as of May 2019.

References

Living people
1952 births
Awami League politicians
9th Jatiya Sangsad members
State Ministers of Housing and Public Works (Bangladesh)
Place of birth missing (living people)